Bukit Panjang Bus Interchange is a bus interchange serving Bukit Panjang New Town, Singapore, located within Hillion Mall. It is diagonally opposite Bukit Panjang Plaza and adjacent to Bukit Panjang station on the Downtown MRT and Bukit Panjang LRT lines.

History
From 16 December 2012 to 3 September 2017, all services originating from the current bus interchange had been re-routed, as it has been closed to make way for the development of the Bukit Panjang Integrated Transport Hub (ITH).

The new interchange within Hillion Mall opened on 4 September 2017 as part of the Bukit Panjang Integrated Transport Hub. 10 services amended to the interchange while the remaining 4 services remained at the temporary bus park while waiting for the new bus terminal at Gali Batu by end-2019. The temporary bus park was replaced by Gali Batu Bus Terminal in 2021.

Bus Contracting Model 

Under the new bus contracting model, all bus services at the interchange are under Choa Chu Kang-Bukit Panjang Bus Package.

Currently, all bus services at the interchange are operated by the anchor operator, SMRT Buses.

List of routes

Gallery

References

External links
 Interchange/Terminal (SMRT Buses)

2017 establishments in Singapore
Bus stations in Singapore
Bukit Panjang